Shivalika is the first 3D animation movie from Odisha, India. Production began in 2010 and completed in January, 2013. The film stars young actors Aman Siddiqui (Bhootnath) and Sparsh Khanchandani (Parvarrish).

Synopsis
This story is about a small boy named Nadu (Aman Siddiqui) who lost his parents several years earlier due to an evil spirit. When the same spirit again attacks and kidnapped his grandmother (Smita Jaykar), he sets off into the jungle to find her and along the way encounters a mysterious place called Shivalika. There he meets many magical creatures which change his view point towards wild animals. He also learns that it's our duty to protect wild animals... especially the endangered ones, like tigers. In the process he turns out to be a courageous prodigy, and eventually confronts that evil spirit to save his grandmother's life.

Production
3D Wizards Pvt. Ltd., in Association with Eastern Media
Crew Members
Production designer – Nikhil Baran Sengupta.
Sound Designer – Pradip Routray.
Editor – Ashok Sharma
Background Score – Milind Sagar.

Voice cast
  Aman Siddiqui (Bhootnath) as Nadu
 Sparsh Khanchandani as Tia
 Mukesh Khanna as Yaksha
 Smita Jaykar as Bomma

Singers
 Shahid Mallya – Jay Bolo
 Shaan – Sunlona
 Richa Sharma – Jiban ek

External links

Indian animated films
2010s Hindi-language films
Indian 3D films
Indian animated fantasy films